Hwang Bo-reum-byeol (born December 21, 1999), is a South Korean actress and model. She began her acting career with Naver TV's web series, The World of My 17 (2020).

Early life
Hwang was born on December 21, 1999, in Changwon, South Gyeongsang, South Korea. She is the winner of the 2019 Miss Chunhyang beauty pageant.

Filmography

Film

Web series

Television series

Awards and nominations

References

External links
Hwang Bo-reum-byeol at Mystic Story

1999 births
Living people
South Korean film actresses
South Korean web series actresses
South Korean television actresses
21st-century South Korean actresses